I Declare War is the fourth album) by deathcore band I Declare War, released in 2011. It is the first album to feature Jamie Hanks on vocals since Jonathan Huber's departure.

Track listing

Personnel 
I Declare War
Jamie Hanks – vocals
Brent Eaton – bass
Ryan Cox – drums
Evan Hughes – guitars
Chris Fugate – guitars

Production
Shawn Carrano – management
Mike Milford – A&R, layout

External links 
 http://www.spirit-of-metal.com/groupe-groupe-I_Declare_War-l-en.html

2011 albums
I Declare War (band) albums